
Gmina Chociwel is an urban-rural gmina (administrative district) in Stargard County, West Pomeranian Voivodeship, in north-western Poland.

The gmina contains part of the protected area called Ińsko Landscape Park.

Villages
Apart from the town of Chociwel, Gmina Chociwel contains the villages and settlements of Bobrowniki, Bród, Chociwel Wieś, Długie, Kamienny Most, Kamionka, Kania, Kania Mała, Karkowo, Lisowo, Lublino, Mokrzyca, Oświno, Pieczonka, Płątkowo, Radomyśl, Sątyrz Drugi, Sątyrz Pierwszy, Spławie, Starzyce, Wieleń Pomorski and Zabrodzie.

Neighbouring gminas
Gmina Chociwel is bordered by the gminas of Dobra, Dobrzany, Ińsko, Marianowo, Maszewo, Stara Dąbrowa and Węgorzyno.

References
Polish official population figures 2006

Chociwel
Stargard County